The Taifa of Arjona was a medieval Islamic taifa Moorish kingdom of Al-Andalus that ruled from 1232 to 1244. It followed Almohad Caliphate control of the area, and was superseded by the Christian Kingdom of Castile rule. The Taifa was ruled by the Arab tribe of Banu Khazraj which had its origin in the Hejaz region of Arabia.

Its capital was in Arjona, which is in the present day Province of Jaén, in Andalusia, southern Spain.

List of Emirs

Nasrid dynasty

Muhammad I ibn al-Ahmar (in Granada 1238–1273): 1232–1244 (d. 1273)

1232 establishments in Europe
1244 disestablishments in Europe
13th century in Al-Andalus
History of Andalusia
Province of Jaén (Spain)
States and territories disestablished in 1244
States and territories established in 1232
Arjona